Koduvai (Koduvāi) is a small town in Tiruppur District in Tamil Nadu, India. It comes under Pongalur block and Tiruppur South taluk. It is located 26 km away from Dharapuram and 25 km from Tiruppur in Tiruppur-Dharapuram highway. The town houses famous temples including NageswaraSami Temple and PeriyaPerumal Temple.

Economy 
Koduvai's economy is based on Agriculture and Handloom Industries. Being proximer to Tiruppur, it also houses some Textile based industries. The town also houses Koduvai Sarvodaya Sangh.

Administration and politics 
Koduvai was a part of Coimbatore district and later Erode district and now Tiruppur district.  It falls under Tiruppur South Assembly constituency and Tiruppur Lok Sabha constituency .

AIADMK, DMK and BJP are the major political parties in this area.

This town houses banks and government hospital.

Connectivity 
Nearby Bus terminal is Dharapuram city bus terminal. There are buses available 24/7 to  Tiruppur, Coimbatore, Dharapuram, Palladam, Madurai, Oddanchatram, Palani and Dindigul. It is also connected to nearby towns like Kangeyam, Uthiyur, Kundadam, Pongalur and AvinashiPalayam via town buses. Nearby Railway station is Tiruppur railway station and nearby airport is Coimbatore International Airport.

See also 

 Dharapuram
 Uthiyur
 Tiruppur

References 

Villages in Tiruppur district